Pylyp Omelyanovych Kozytskiy (23 October, 1893 – 27 April, 1960) was a Soviet and Ukrainian composer, musicologist, professor, head of the department of history of music at the Kyiv Conservatory, and Honored Art Worker of the Ukrainian SSR (1943).

Greatly influenced by expressionism, Kozytsky's musical works are a mixture of elements of Ukrainian folk music with social and patriotic characteristics, strongly rooted to the national school of classical music of Ukraine established by Mykola Lysenko.

Life
Kozytskiy was born in Letychivka and studied at the Kyiv Theological Academy from 1917 and at the Kyiv Conservatory from 1920, under Boleslav Yavorsky and Reinhold Glière. Between 1918-1924, he taught at the Lysenko Music and Drama Institute in Kyiv, the Kharkiv Music and Drama Institute from 1925 to 1935, and the Kyiv Conservatory. From 1938 to 1941 he worked as artistic director for the Ukrainian State Philharmonic (during the German-Soviet war).

Kozytskyi's adopted daughter Gulya Korolyova was a popular child actress in the 1930s. After she died in action in 1942, she was glorified as one of the Soviet official martyrs for the Fatherland.

A founding member of the Leontovych Music Society, Kozytskyi was also head of the Union of Soviet Composers of Ukraine from 1952 to 1956, and president of the Choral Society of the Ukrainian SSR from 1959 up to his death in 1960. Kozytskiy died in Kyiv on 27 April 1960, and is buried in the Baikove Cemetery.

Musical works

Operas
 Unknown Soldier (1934)
 Jean Giradin (1937)
 For the Fatherland (1943) - For symphony orchestra

Cantatas
 In memory of the Bolsheviks (1951) - For choir a cappella
 Hello, Spring (1952) - For children's choir

Symphony orchestra
 Kozak Holota (1925) - Suite 
 Partisan's Daughter (1938) - Poem 
 Variations on a theme of the folk song Kupala (1925) - For String Quartet 
 Variations on a theme of the Bashkirs (1943)

Piano
 Pages of Childhood (1913)
 7 Preludes - For voice and piano, with words by P. Tychyna, and R. Tagore

Choir
 Spring Oratorio (1921)
 Eight Preludes Songs (1924)
 Brave Navy (1925) - Diptych, with words by Pavlo Tychyna
 Eight Ukrainian folk stories (1936) 
 We are the country of Soviet children (1952)
 Green kudryavchik (1954)

Romances
 Song of Yakir - With words by Volodymyr Sosiura

Music for plays
 The King is amused by Victor Hugo (1927) - For the Berezil Theater 
 Sava Chalyi by Nikolai Gogol (1927) 
 Bridgehead by Miroslav Irchan (1932)

Music for movies
 Stozhary (1939)
 Kuban (1939)

Literary works
 History of Ukrainian Music (Kyiv, 1922)
 The mass singing. Allowance for amateur choir (Kharkiv, 1927)
 Bedrich Smetana (Kyiv, 1949)
 Scientific studies and articles on the works of Mykola Leontovych, Kyrylo Stetsenko, Borys Lyatoshynsky, Bedřich Smetana and others. (Kyiv, 1952)
 Taras Shevchenko and musical culture (Kyiv, 1959)
 Singing and Music Academy in Kyiv in 300 years of its existence (Kyiv, 1971)
 The stepfather of the heroine of the Great Patriotic War Guli Queen

Awards and honors
 Order of Lenin
 Order of the Red Banner of Labour (June 30, 1951)
 Honored Art Worker of the Ukrainian SSR (1943)

Notes

References

Attribution
 This article is based on the translation of the corresponding article of the Ukrainian Wikipedia. A list of contributors can be found there in the History section.

1893 births
1960 deaths
People from Cherkasy Oblast
People from Kiev Governorate
Kiev Theological Academy alumni
Academic staff of Kyiv Conservatory
Recipients of the Order of Lenin
Recipients of the Order of the Red Banner of Labour
Male classical composers
Soviet male classical composers
Soviet music educators
Soviet musicologists
Soviet opera composers
Ukrainian classical composers
Ukrainian music educators
Ukrainian musicologists
Ukrainian opera composers
Burials at Baikove Cemetery